Guelaât Bou Sbaâ is a district in Guelma Province, Algeria. It ranks second in population after Guelma District. It was named after its capital, Guelaât Bou Sbaâ.

Municipalities
The district is further divided into 6 municipalities, which is the highest number in the province:
Guelaât Bou Sbaâ
Nechmaya 
Djeballah Khemissi
Boumahra Ahmed 
Beni Mezline
Belkheir

References 

 
Districts of Guelma Province

fr:Guelaat Bou Sbaa